Peace Garden may refer to:

 International Peace Garden on the Canada/US Border
 International Peace Gardens in Salt Lake City
 International Peace Garden Airport in North Dakota
 Peace Garden at Nathan Phillips Square in Toronto
 St Thomas' Peace Garden in Birmingham

See also
 Peace park (disambiguation)